Takayuki Inoue may refer to:

 Takayuki Inoue, Japanese voice actor, best known as Tolle Koenig in Mobile Suit Gundam SEED
 Takayuki Inoue (musician), lead guitarist and backing singer of Japanese band The Spiders